Canary Wharf is a London River Services pier on the River Thames in Canary Wharf, London. It is located next to Westferry Circus.

Services
It is served by two commuter oriented services, both operated by Thames Clippers under licence from London River Services. The main commuter service from central London or Woolwich calls at Canary Wharf Pier on a regular basis. The Canary Wharf - Rotherhithe Ferry, also operated by Thames Clippers, links Canary Wharf Pier with Nelson Dock Pier at the Hilton Hotel in Rotherhithe. The service uses smaller boats than the commuter service but runs at a higher frequency of roughly every 10 minutes. The ferry can be used both by guests of the hotel as well as by passengers not staying at the hotel.

Since 2013 boats have run direct as far as Fulham & Putney (the RB6 service), taking roughly one hour.  The evening direct service departs at 1750.  Later services to Putney require a five-minute change at Embankment, leaving Canary Wharf at 1758, 1818, 1858, 1918, 1958.

Private charter entertainment boats also use Canary Wharf Pier.

Connections
 London Buses routes 135; 277; D3; D7; D8.
 Westferry DLR station
 West India Quay DLR station
 Canary Wharf railway station
 Canary Wharf DLR station
 Canary Wharf tube station

Lines

Gallery

References

External links
 

Canary Wharf
London River Services
Transport in the London Borough of Tower Hamlets
Piers in London
Buildings and structures in the London Borough of Tower Hamlets